William Manuel Badell López (born June 29, 1996) is a Venezuelan model as well as male beauty pageant titleholder. He won Mister Supranational Venezuela in 2021 where he represented Venezuela in Mister Supranational 2021 where he ended up winning the third place behind the eventual winner, Varo Vargas of Peru.

Life and career

Early life 
Badell was born in Maracaibo, Zulia but his entire life grow up in Valencia, Carabobo. He is a Mass Media and Social Communications student and he is currently living in Dubai where he works as a model and cabin crew flight attendant member for Emirates Airlines. He has six siblings. Badell comes from the Wayúu ethnic group

Pageantry

Mister Supranational Venezuela 2021
In 2021, William participated in the 2nd edition of Mister Supranational Venezuela held on May 27, 2021, at Globovisión studios in Caracas which was held in conjunction with the second edition of Miss Supranational Venezuela, where Valentina Sánchez obtained the title. William also got the Mister Fitness special award.

During the final question and answer round all the five finalist were asked the same question, "Why do you think you should be the next Mister Supranational Venezuela, taking into account these two keywords: aspirational and inspirational?," Badell answered:Good night Venezuela. I want to be the next Mister Supranational Venezuela because I want to send a message not only to Venezuelans but to the whole world, a message of inspiration. I want to inspire all those people who believe that they cannot meet their goals and it is false, with dedication and effort everything can be achieved, in the same way, I can grow and aspire to be a better person. Being Mister Supranational Venezuela will give me the opportunity to carry a strong and clear message to the whole world. Many thanks.At the end of the event, his predecessor, Leonardo Carrero, presented the scarf and the trophy to Badell as the new Mister Supranational Venezuela.

Mister Supranational 2021 
He represented Venezuela at the Mister Supranational 2021 pageant on August 22, 2021, in Strzelecki Park Amphitheater, Nowy Sącz, Małopolska, Poland. Badell end his participation placing as the 2nd Runner-Up, making the third time Venezuela enters in the group of finalists in Mister Supranational. William also won the Mister Photogenic Award.

References

External links

 
 
Mister Supranational Venezuela Official Website
Mister Supranational Official Website

Male beauty pageant winners
Living people
Venezuelan male models
1996 births
People from Maracaibo